Spratly is a surname. Notable people with the surname include:

Henry Spratly, notable for surveying and naming Mischief Reef in 1791, when sailing through what is now known as the Spratly Islands
Richard Spratly, master of the British whaler, the Cyrus South Seaman, notable for naming Spratly Island
William Spratly, the Second Officer of the British whaler, the Cyrus South Seaman and brother of Richard Spratly